Beinn na h-Eaglaise (736 m) is a mountain in the Northwest Highlands of Scotland. It lies in Wester Ross, south of the village of Torridon.

A steep mountain, it has a very craggy north east face and is almost entirely surrounded by stalker's paths. The view from the summit takes in the peak's famous neighbours such as the Munros Liathach and Maol Cheann-dearg.

References

Marilyns of Scotland
Grahams
Mountains and hills of the Northwest Highlands